The Saint Thérèse of the Child Jesus Parish, is located along Silangan Road inside the University of the Philippines Los Baños campus and is often referred to as the unofficial UPLB Chapel. It is one of the three Roman catholic churches in the municipality of Los Baños, Laguna, Philippines. The church is designated as the Diocesan Shrine of Saint Thérèse of the Child Jesus of the Roman Catholic Diocese of San Pablo on October 1, 2016.

Church history 
The devotion to St. Thérèse of the Child Jesus started in the mid-1920s due to students and professors of the university. Upon petitioning church authorities to build a chapel outside the university's perimeter fence, a chapel was built in honor of St. Thérèse in 1927 with a seating capacity of 120 people. Since then, it became the unofficial university chapel. The parish was officially established under the Archdiocese of Lipa in 1958. It serves the spiritual needs of the former parishioners of the Immaculate Conception Parish living around the University of the Philippines College of Agriculture and College of Forestry. The first parish priest was Father John Hurley.   Due to lack of priests, the parish was administered by priests from the Society of the Divine Word (SVD) for 33 years. The present church with a seating capacity of 1,500 was built and blessed in 1971. In 2000, the secular priests took charge of the parish with Monsignor Bernardino Cortez and Father Gabriel Ma. Delfino as parish priest and assistant parish priest respectively. When Monsignor Cortez was appointed as Auxiliary Bishop of Manila, Monsignor James Contreras succeeded as parish priest. From 2008 to 2013, the church was administered by Father Jose Thor R. Villacarlos, and was succeeded by to Rev. Fr. Luis A. Tolentino, parish priest (2013-2019) and its first shrine rector (2016-2019).

In 2013, the relics of St. Thérèse visited the UPLB community as part of its world pilgrimage. The parish church was elevated to a diocesan shrine on October 1, 2016.

Facilities 
Most of the church facilities and adjacent church structures was constructed under the Foundation of St. Thérèse Parish, Inc. (FSTPI) which caters the material needs of the church. It includes the parish rectory (including the rectory annex), Garden of Peace (ossuary), St. Thérèse Baptistry, Resurrection Chapel, and sacristy 

From 2019 up to the present, the Diocesan Shrine of St. Therese of the Child Jesus (DSSTCJ) is under the pastoral care of its parish priest and shrine rector, Rev. Fr. Philip B. Atienza, and is assisted by Rev. Fr. Jomarie M. Alcantara, as well as the Priests from the Verbum SVD House of Studies, headed by Rev. Fr. Abraham P. Paz as its current administrator.

References

External links 
Official Facebook page of the Diocesan Shrine of St. Therese of the Child Jesus UPLB

Roman Catholic churches in Laguna (province)
Los Baños, Laguna
University of the Philippines Los Baños
Churches in the Roman Catholic Diocese of San Pablo